Hvardiiske is an urban-type settlement in  Simferopol Raion of the Autonomous Republic of Crimea, a territory recognized by a majority of countries as part of Ukraine and incorporated by Russia as part of the Republic of Crimea since the 2014 annexation of Crimea. Population:

Hvardiiske airbase 
Next to the town is an airbase formerly under the jurisdiction of the Russian Black Sea Fleet, now controlled by the Russian Air Force, Gvardeyskoye (air base).

In June 1990, the 43rd independent Naval Assault Aviation Regiment arrived at the airbase from Choibalsan in Mongolia. In February and March 2014, Russia annexed Crimea. On 1 July 2014, the regiment moved to Saky (air base) also in the Crimea. 

On August 16, 2022, the airbase was hit by an explosion, and Russian occupation authorities said they were investigating a drone attack on an ammunition depot.

See also
 Kacha, Sevastopol

References

External links
 Hvardiiske at the Verkhovna Rada of Ukraine site

Urban-type settlements in Crimea
Simferopol Raion